Nkechi Ka Egenamba (born 24th September 1983), (first name pronounced n-kay-chee) known as Ninja, is an English rapper and the female lead vocalist for the British indie band The Go! Team. Doing a mixture of rapping, chanting and singing, Ninja is well known for her energetic stage performances and dancing. In 2005, NME voted Ninja the 15th coolest person in music.

Early life and education
Born Nkechi Ka in 1983, "Nkechi" is short for Nkechinyere, and means "what God has given" or "gift of God" in Igbo, the language of the Igbo people, an ethnic group in West Africa, numbering in the tens of millions.

Ninja is from London. Her father is a Nigerian lawyer, and her mother is half-Egyptian, half-Nigerian. Ninja is one of five children and was brought up in a very strict household. She had been studying at university before she joined The Go! Team.

The Go! Team

Ninja became lead singer for The Go! Team after founder Ian Parton created the first The Go! Team studio album. With Ninja, the live band became a "separate entity" to the original studio vision, as their performances became radically different from their recordings, particularly due to Ninja's freestyled vocals contrary to the sampled vocals present on the album. Parton acknowledged that Ninja had become the "face of the band" in an interview with Erik Leijon in September 2007.

Non-Go! Team work
Ninja co-wrote and performed on Simian Mobile Disco tracks "Its The Beat" and "Hot Dog" on SMD's debut album Attack Decay Sustain Release.

Ninja co-wrote and performed on the track "Time Machine" by French band Rinocerose.

She co-wrote and performed on the Cut Chemist track "The Audience is Listening".

Discography with The Go! Team

Albums
 Thunder, Lightning, Strike (2004) #48 UK
 Proof of Youth (2007) #21 UK, #142 US, #1 UK Indie
 Rolling Blackouts (2011)
 The Scene Between (2015)
 Semicircle (2018) #40 UK
Get Up Sequences Part One (2021) #93 UK

Singles
 "Junior Kickstart" 7", 12" and CD single (2003)
 "The Power Is On" 12" single (2004)
 "Ladyflash" 7" and CD single (2004) #68 UK
 "Bottle Rocket" 7" and CD single (2005) #64 UK
 "Ladyflash" (re-issue) 7" and CD single (2006) #26 UK
 "Grip Like a Vice" single (2007) #57 UK
 "Doing It Right" Single (2007) #55 UK, #3 UK Indie

EPs
 Are You Ready for More? (Australian Tour EP) (2005)
 Audio Assault Course (College Radio Sessions) (2006)
 Step and Repeat (8 track EP) (2006)

Featured on
 Public Service Broadcast #3 (2004) (compilation album)
 Help: A Day in the Life (2005) (compilation album)

See also
Mononymous persons

References

External links 
 Ninja - Ninja's official website
 The Go! Team - official website
 Memphis Industries: The Go! Team - UK label-operated band website
 The Go! Team - Titanic Fandalism - Unofficial Go! Team fan site
 A Study of Ninja's Contribution to the Go! Team - Bibliography and references

1983 births
Living people
Igbo rappers
Rappers from London
English women rappers
English people of Egyptian descent
English people of Nigerian descent
English people of Igbo descent
Women rock singers
21st-century English women singers
21st-century English singers